Ubiquitin carboxyl-terminal hydrolase 33 is an enzyme that in humans is encoded by the USP33 gene.

Interactions 

USP33 has been shown to interact with DIO2, SELENBP1 and Von Hippel–Lindau tumor suppressor.

References

Further reading